Laporte (originally spelled La Porte and alternatively spelled LaPorte) is an unincorporated town, a post office, and a census-designated place (CDP) located in and governed by Larimer County, Colorado, United States. The CDP is a part of the Fort Collins, CO Metropolitan Statistical Area. The Laporte post office has the ZIP Code 80535. At the United States Census 2010, the population of the Laporte CDP was 2,450, while the population of the 80535 ZIP Code Tabulation Area was 2,636 including adjacent areas.

History
The town was first settled by French-Canadian fur trappers and mountain men. It was the gateway to all the mountainous region lying north of the South Platte River and extending from the Plains to the Continental Divide. The trappers built cabins here along the Cache la Poudre River as early as 1828, making it the first settlement in Larimer County. According to legend, a group of fur traders had earlier stashed supplies (including gunpowder) in a cache along the river near Laporte, and that is how the river got its name. It became the home of Antoine Janis in 1844, who is often noted as the first permanent settler north of the Arkansas River. A band of mountaineers, hunters and trappers made LaPorte their headquarters for fur catching and trading operations. The settlement increased in numbers, including 150 lodges of Arapaho Indians who settled peacefully along the river and in the valley. The town was named by the fur trappers, many with Native American wives, who settled in the area in the mid-19th century. The name la porte means "the door" in French.

The winter of 1849 brought Kit Carson and his company of trappers to the Cache la Poudre, where they set up camp. In 1860 a town company was organized, originally called "Colona". Between fifty and sixty log dwellings were erected that year along the banks of the Cache la Poudre River in the valley, and in November 1861 the territorial legislature designated Laporte as the county seat. In 1862, the town of Colona changed its name to "LaPorte", and was named the headquarters of the Mountain Division of the Overland Trail Stage Route. The first post office opened, and a stage stop was built on the Overland Trail. A station was erected right along the river, very near where the present Overland Trail crosses the river. Mrs. Taylor, wife of the first stationmaster, was a "good cook" and "gracious hostess", and as described by one diarist, knows "what to do with beans and dried apples." The stage fare from Denver to LaPorte was $20.00. The first bridge over the Cache la Poudre River was built as a toll bridge, and during the rush to California, numerous wagons and stage coaches crossed it every day. The toll charged was anywhere from $.50 to $8.00, depending on what source of information is used. In 1864, the bridge was washed away by a flood, and a ferry was rigged up and used for several years until the county built another bridge.

LaPorte soon became a bustling business and supply center for emigrants, with wagon trains and stagecoaches constantly passing through. There were four saloons, a brewery, a butcher shop, two blacksmith shops, a general store and a hotel. The store was a thriving business, sometimes making as much as $1,000 per day. LaPorte was the most important settlement north of Denver, housing the stage station, the county court house, the military, Indians, and trappers. In 1862, Camp Collins was established by the U.S. Army along the river to protect the stage line from attack by Native Americans. Also that same year, the Laporte Townsite Company claimed  of land for the town. In 1863 the 13th Kansas volunteer infantry was stationed to Laporte, acting as escort for the Overland Stage on the trail to Virginia Dale. During the flood of 1864, the army camp was covered with water, and the soldiers had to suddenly flee to higher ground.

Geography
Laporte is located on the Cache la Poudre River northwest of Fort Collins, close to where the river emerges from the foothills of the Rocky Mountains. U.S. Route 287 runs along the northern edge of the community, leading southeast  to Fort Collins and northwest  to Laramie, Wyoming.

Demographics

Fiction
In L. Neil Smith's North American Confederacy series of novels, beginning with The Probability Broach, an alternate-history LaPorte is one of the major cities of North America, occupying roughly half the area of Larimer County, and with a population of over two million people, whereas the city of Denver does not exist; in its place are the two small historic settlements of Saint Charles Town and Auraria.

See also

Outline of Colorado
Index of Colorado-related articles
State of Colorado
Colorado cities and towns
Colorado census designated places
Colorado counties
Larimer County, Colorado
List of statistical areas in Colorado
Front Range Urban Corridor
North Central Colorado Urban Area
Fort Collins-Loveland, CO Metropolitan Statistical Area

References

External links

Laporte @ Colorado.com
Laporte @ UncoverColorado.com
History of LaPorte
Larimer County website

Census-designated places in Larimer County, Colorado
Census-designated places in Colorado
Former county seats in Colorado